Chirality timeline presents a timeline of landmark events that unfold the developments happened in the field of chirality.

Many molecules come in two forms that are mirror images of each other, just like our hands. This type of molecule is called chiral. In nature, one of these forms is usually more common than the other. In our cells, one of these mirror images of a molecule fits "like a glove," while the other may be harmful.

In nature, molecules with chirality include hormones, DNA, antibodies, and enzymes. For example, (R)-limonene smells like oranges, while (S)-limonene smells like lemons. Both molecules have the same chemical formula, but their spatial orientations are different, which makes a big difference in their biological properties. Chiral molecules in the receptors in our noses can tell the difference between these things. Chirality affects biochemical reactions, and the way a drug works depends on what kind of enantiomer it is. Many drugs are chiral and it is important that the shape of the drug matches the shape of the cell receptor it is meant to affect. Mismatching will make the drug less effective, which could be a matter of life and death, as happened with thalidomide in the 1960s.

It has long been known that structural factors, particularly chirality and stereochemistry, have a big impact on pharmacological efficacy and pharmacokinetic behavior. Since more than a century ago, pertinent information pertaining to chirality has been accumulating in numerous fields, in particular, physics, chemistry and biology, at an accelerated rate, giving rise to more comprehensive and in-depth reasoning, conceptions, and ideas. This page offers a chronology of significant contributions that have been made in the journey of chirality [1809 to 2021].

Chirality timeline

See also 
 Chirality
 Chiral drugs
 Stereochemistry
 Timeline of chemistry
 List of Nobel Laureates in chemistry

References

External links 

 Official website of the Nobel Foundation

Chirality
Stereochemistry